The 2013–14 season was Atalanta Bergamasca Calcio's 106th season in existence and the club's third consecutive season in the top flight of Italian football.

Players

Squad information

Transfers 
 Only first players.

In 

Total spending:  €6,900,000

Out 

Total gaining:  €10,300,000

Competitions

Serie A

League table

Matches

Coppa Italia

Statistics

Appearances and goals

|-
! colspan="10" style="background:#dcdcdc; text-align:center"| Goalkeepers

|-
! colspan="10" style="background:#dcdcdc; text-align:center"| Defenders

|-
! colspan="10" style="background:#dcdcdc; text-align:center"| Midfielders

|-
! colspan="10" style="background:#dcdcdc; text-align:center"| Forwards

|-
! colspan="10" style="background:#dcdcdc; text-align:center"| Players transferred out during the season

Top scorers
This includes all competitive matches.  The list is sorted by shirt number when total goals are equal.
{| class="wikitable sortable" style="font-size: 95%; text-align: center;"
|-
!width=15|
!width=15|
!width=15|
!width=15|
!width=150|Name
!width=80|Serie A
!width=80|Coppa Italia
!width=80|Total
|-
|1
|19
|FW
|
|Germán Denis
|11
|0
|11
|-
|2
|91
|FW
|
|Giuseppe De Luca
|3
|3
|6
|-
|3
|10
|MF
|
|Giacomo Bonaventura
|5
|0
|5
|-
|=
|11
|MF
|
|Maxi Moralez
|5
|0
|5
|-
|5
|7
|FW
|
|Marko Livaja
|2
|2
|4
|-
|6
|28
|DF
|
|Davide Brivio
|3
|0
|3
|-
|7
|2
|DF
|
|Guglielmo Stendardo
|2
|0
|2
|-
|=
|17
|MF
|
|Carlos Carmona
|1
|0
|2
|-
|=
|21
|MF
|
|Luca Cigarini
|2
|0
|2
|-
|10
|3
|DF
|
|Stefano Lucchini
|1
|0
|1
|-
|=
|8
|MF
|
|Giulio Migliaccio
|1
|0
|1
|-
|=
|20
|MF
|
|Marcelo Estigarribia
|1
|0
|1
|-
|=
|90
|MF
|
|Moussa Koné
|0
|1
|1

References

External links
 Official Atalanta BC Website
 Tutto Atalanta: Atalanta News & Gossip

Atalanta B.C. seasons
Atalanta